Michael Trim may refer to:

Mike Trim (born 1945), artist
Michael Trim (television producer), television producer and director